This is a list of the number-one hits of 2013 on FIMI's Italian Singles and Albums Charts.

See also
 2013 in music
 List of number-one hits in Italy

References

Number-one hits
Italy
2013